Bridgton can refer to a place in the United States:

 Bridgton, Maine, a town
 Bridgton (CDP), Maine, the town center

See also
Bridgeton (disambiguation)